Styaks Swamp is one of the volcanoes in the Auckland volcanic field. It is located north of Green Hill. The crater once contained a swamp but is now covered by industrial development.

References

City of Volcanoes: A geology of Auckland - Searle, Ernest J.; revised by Mayhill, R.D.; Longman Paul, 1981. First published 1964. .
Volcanoes of Auckland: A Field Guide. Hayward, B.W.; Auckland University Press, 2019, 335 pp. .

Auckland volcanic field